Jean-Guy Trépanier (3 February 1932 – 30 March 2018) was a politician in the Quebec, Canada.  He served as Member of the Legislative Assembly.

Early life

He was born on February 3, 1932, in Shawinigan, Mauricie and was a notary.

Political career

Trépanier won a by-election as a Liberal candidate to the Legislative Assembly of Quebec in the district of Saint-Maurice in 1965.  He was succeeding Judge René Hamel who had recently resigned.

In 1966 though, he lost against Union Nationale candidate Philippe Demers.

Footnotes

1932 births
2018 deaths
French Quebecers
Quebec Liberal Party MNAs
Université Laval alumni